The Western Journal of Emergency Medicine: Integrating Emergency Care with Population Health, (WestJEM) is a bimonthly peer-reviewed, fully open access medical journal.

WestJEM focuses on how the systems and delivery of emergency care affect health, health disparities, and health outcomes in communities and populations worldwide, including the impact of social conditions on the composition of patients seeking care in emergency departments. It is published by the University of California’s California Digital Library through eScholarship, on behalf of the University of California, Irvine Department of Emergency Medicine.

The current editor-in-chief is Mark I. Langdorf, MD, MHPE, Professor of Clinical Emergency Medicine in the University California, Irvine School of Medicine.

The current Managing Associate Editor is Shahram Lotfipour, MD Professor of Clinical Emergency Medicine and Public Health at the University California, Irvine School of Medicine.

WestJEM is the official journal of California chapter of the American College of Emergency Physicians (ACEP), the American College of Osteopathic Emergency Physicians (ACOEP) and the California chapter division of the American Academy of Emergency Medicine (AAEM). WestJEM actively supports scholarly publishing from junior faculty by devoting additional space, consideration and editorial support. The journal is supported by some 80 academic departments of emergency medicine in the US.

Journal Distribution 
WestJEM Circulation: 19,000 electronic, 2,800 print

Pageviews and downloads: 250,000 per month/3 million per year

Abstracting and indexing

 Clarivate Analytics’ (formerly Thomson Reuters’) Science Citation Index Expanded
 Scopus
 Index Medicus/MEDLINE/PubMed
 PubMed Central
 Europe PubMed Central Full-Text
 Directory of Open Access Journals Abstracts
 Google Scholar Full-Text
 HINARI Access to Research in Health Programme
 Embase (Elsevier)
 EBSCO/CINAHL

Impact Factor and Journal Ranking 

 Clarivate Analytics (previously Thomson Reuters) 2-year Impact Factor: 3.988
 14/31 in category worldwide, and 6th among general emergency medicine journals 
 Scimago Journal and Country Rank Index (SJR 2021): 10/94 emergency medicine journals (cites/doc; 3 years) and 5th among general emergency medicine journals
 Scopus CiteScore (2021): 3.7, which places 18/90 emergency medicine journals, and 9th among general emergency medicine journals worldwide
 Altmetric social media ranking 6/35 emergency medicine journals

Affiliated Journals 
Yearly Special Issue on Education Research and Practice, sponsored by the Council of Emergency Medicine Residency Directors (CORD) and the Clerkship Directors in Emergency Medicine

 Guest Editors Jeff Love, MD, Georgetown University and Douglas Ander, MD, Emory University.

Clinical Practice and Cases in Emergency Medicine (CPC-EM)

 Case reports, Case series, and Images
 Indexed in PubMed and PubMed Central
 Editor in Chief: Rick McPheeters, DO, Kern Medical
 https://westjem.com/cpc_em

Mediterranean Journal of Emergency Medicine and Acute Care

 Editor in Chief: Amin A. Kazzi, MD, American University of Beirut, Lebanon
 https://www.medjem.me/

References

External links

Open access journals
Emergency medicine journals
Publications established in 2000
English-language journals